Tweedia is a genus of flowering plants in the family Apocynaceae, first described as a genus in 1835. The genus is native to South America. An ornamental plant, Oxypetalum coeruleum, formerly included in this genus is commonly referred to as "tweedia".

Species
 Tweedia andina (Phil.) G.H.Rua - Chile
 Tweedia aucaensis G.H. Rua -  Argentina
 Tweedia australis (Malme) C. Ezcurra - Argentina
 Tweedia birostrata (Hook. & Arn.) Hook. & Arn. - Chile
 Tweedia brunonis Hook. & Arn. - Argentina, Bolivia, Paraguay
 Tweedia echegarayi (Hieron.) Malme - Argentina
 Tweedia solanoides (Hook. & Arn.) Chittenden - Argentina, Brazil, Paraguay, Uruguay

formerly included
 Tweedia coerulea, syn of Oxypetalum coeruleum
 Tweedia floribunda, syn of  Oxypetalum solanoides
 Tweedia macrolepis, syn of  Oxypetalum macrolepis
 Tweedia versicolor , syn of Oxypetalum coeruleum

References

Asclepiadoideae
Flora of South America
Apocynaceae genera
Taxa named by William Jackson Hooker